Dr. V Kumar currently serves as the Salvatore Zizza  Professor of Marketing, Tobin College of Business, St. John's University, NY, USA. Earlier he served as the Distinguished Term Professor and Senior Fellow at the Indian School of Business and prior to that he served as the faculty at the J. Mack Robinson College of Business at Georgia State University, where he held the Richard and Susan Lenny Distinguished Chair in Marketing.

Kumar was inducted into the Inaugural Analytics Hall of Fame along with a group of distinguished individuals who have contributed significantly to the advancement of Analytics in Business.

American Marketing Association Foundation has named an award in honor of him: the V. Kumar Award for Service to Marketing Scholarship.

Early life 
Kumar was born in Chennai, India. His mother worked as a telephone operator and his father was a clerk in the Indian Railways. Both parents instilled in him the value of higher education and encouraged him to become an engineer. On their advice, he entered the Indian Institute of Technology (IIT) of Madras. After graduating with a Bachelor of Technology (BTech), he continued his education in the MTech Program in Industrial Management at IIT-Madras. It was here where Kumar discovered his interest in Marketing. Motivated by his professor, he then moved to the United States to do research on Quantitative Marketing in the PhD program in Marketing at the University of Texas at Austin.

Publications 
Kumar has published over 250 articles in academic journals, trade publications and books related to Sales & Marketing. It has generated 44,000 Google Scholar citations. with an h-index of 87 and an i10-index of 175

References 

Georgia State University faculty
Living people
Year of birth missing (living people)
Journal of Marketing editors